{{DISPLAYTITLE:C16H16O8}}
The molecular formula C16H16O8 (molar mass: 336.29 g/mol, exactMass = 336.084517 u) may refer to:

 4-Caffeoyl-1,5-quinide
 Dactylifric acid

Molecular formulas